Robert Pferdmenges (27 March 1880 in Mönchengladbach – 28 September 1962 in Cologne) was a German banker and CDU politician.
He was a member of the Bundestag from 1950 to 1962 and a close friend to Konrad Adenauer.

Bibliography
 Peter Fuchs: Nur wenige Kölner haben Pferdmenges je gesehen. In: Kölner Themen. Greven, Köln 1996, .
 Nikolaus Jakobsen: Robert Pferdmenges. Olzog, München 1957.
 Christoph Silber-Bonz: Pferdmenges und Adenauer. Bouvier, Bonn 1997, .
 
 Wilhelm Treue: Das Schicksal des Bankhauses Sal. Oppenheim jr. & Cie und seine Inhaber im Dritten Reich. Steiner, Wiesbaden 1983.
 Wilhelm Treue: Robert Pferdmenges (1880-1962). In: Kölner Unternehmer im 19. und 20. Jahrhundert. (Rheinisch-Westfälische Wirtschaftsbiographien, Band 13.) Aschendorff, Münster 1986, S. 203–222.
 Volker Woschnik, Jan Wucherpfenning: Robert Pferdmenges, Bankier in turbulenten Zeiten. In: Zeugen städtischer Vergangenheit. Band 24. Mönchengladbach 2006, .

References

External links

 
Robert-Pferdmenges-Str. in Cologne

1880 births
1962 deaths
People from Mönchengladbach
German bankers
Members of the Landtag of North Rhine-Westphalia
Members of the Bundestag for North Rhine-Westphalia
Members of the Bundestag 1961–1965
Members of the Bundestag 1957–1961
Members of the Bundestag 1953–1957
Members of the Bundestag 1949–1953
Grand Crosses with Star and Sash of the Order of Merit of the Federal Republic of Germany
Alterspräsidents of the Bundestag
Members of the Bundestag for the Christian Democratic Union of Germany